Grande Fratello VIP 4 (as known by the acronym GFVIP4)  is the fourth celebrity season of the Italian reality television franchise Grande Fratello.

The show was launched on 8 January 2020 on Canale 5, the journalist Alfonso Signorini as presenter of the main show after Ilary Blasi left the show after three seasons, with the showgirl Wanda Nara and the singer Pupo as opinionists. The live stream is broadcast on Mediaset Extra and Grande Fratello official website, also La 5 broadcast several times per day. Daily recaps are broadcast on Canale 5 and Italia 1.

For the first time in Grande Fratello history, the show features two live shows within a week, except Sanremo Music Festival week when the show only aired one live show on Monday 3 February. With the beginning of the nineteenth season of the talent show Amici di Maria De Filippi in the prime time of Canale 5 on Friday 28 February, the Grande Fratello VIP 4 is aired only once a week starting from Monday 24 February.

On 1 March 2020, Mediaset announced that the show would be extended until Monday 27 April 2020, with the season being a total of 111 days.

Due to the COVID-19 pandemic in Italy, starting from 8 March, no more guest would be able to enter the house. Beginning with the sixteenth live show on Wednesday 11 March 2020 and continuing for the remainder of the show, all live shows would air without the audience in the studio to respects the governmental procedures imposed. And the length of the show was reduced to 92 days which finished on 8 April 2020.

Paola Di Benedetto was announced as the winner of the season.

Housemates 
The age of the housemates refers to the time of entry into the house.

Guests

Nominations table

Week 1 - Week 7

Week 8 - Finale

Note 

: During the first live show, Alfonso announced the news to the housemates that Grande Fratello decided that a male housemate would leave the house. Only female housemates could vote for which male housemate they want to evict. Fabio received the most votes, he left the house immediately. In fact, he wasn't evicted and moved to the Privèe, but the housemates believed he was evicted.
: Fabio returned to the main house during the second live show.
: Only male housemates could nominate and the housemate that received the most votes would have power. Rita received the most votes and she had to nominate one of the four former housemates in the Privè. She nominated Patrick. The host Alfonso revealed that Patrick had to choose a housemate to face public vote with him from the Privèe. He chose Salvo.
: Salvo was ejected due to his male chauvinist and offensive sentences.
: On Day 8, housemates could only nominate one housemate of their own gender.
: The housemates in the Privèe had to face a public vote.
: On Day 10, only male housemates could be nominated. Out of the housemates with the most votes (Denver, Fabio and Iván), the housemates in the Privèe had to choose one to face off in the public vote. They chose Denver.
: Adriana, Andrea, Aristide, Barbara, Pago, Paolo and Rita were immune as they were voted as favourite of the week.
: Housemates were split into six pairs and they had to win immunity and a nomination power in a task. Antonio & Paola won the task over Carlotta & Denver and they had to nominate one of them; they chose Carlotta. Clizia & Michele won the task over Fabio & Fernanda and they nominated Fernanda. Antonella & Patrick won the task over Iván & Licia and they nominated Iván.
: The seven immuned housemates had to save one of the nominated housemates, with 6 to 1, they saved Fernanda.
: During Day 15 and 16, a surprise nomination was made. Some housemates made the nomination publicly while others have been in secret. Fernanda, the most voted housemate, was automatically nominated for eviction. The public vote was not to evict, instead, the housemate with the fewest votes would be the first nominated on Day 20. The public vote was cancelled because Barbara was evacuated due to health reasons.
: The eight housemates with most votes in the favorite vote won immunity. 
: Every immune housemate had to save a housemate one by one, the last housemate without being saved was nominated. When Carlotta and Patrick were the last ones remaining, Pago as the most voted housemate in the favorite vote, saved Carlota, which meant that Patrick was nominated.
: Adriana, Antonella, Antonio, Barbara, Fernanda, Licia, Pago and Paolo were immune since they are voted as the favorite of the week, and Serena also immune as the new housemate. But every privilege has a cost. For the nominations, the immune housemates would make the nominations in public, and the other housemates would make nominations in the confessional as usual. The public did not vote to save but the housemate received the least vote would be the first nominated on Day 27. Michele received the least vote, therefore being the first nominated for the next nomination, and face the public vote with Adriana, Barbara and Fabio.
: Carlotta decides to withdraw from the show for personal reasons.
: Andrea, Antonella, Antonio, Aristide, Clizia, Denver, Fernanda and Licia were immune since they are voted as the favorite of the week, and Serena also immune as the new housemate. For the nominations, the immune housemates would make the nominations in the confessional, and the other housemates would make nominations in public.
: Adriana, Andrea, Antonio, Clizia, Fernanda and Paolo were immune since they are voted as the favorite of the week. For the nominations, the immune housemates would make the nominations in the confessional, and the other housemates would make nominations in public. The public did not vote to save but the housemate received the least vote would be the first nominated on Day 38.
: After the nominations, Barbara revealed she wanted to withdraw from the show for personal reasons. Her nomination was therefore nullified. Antonella, who had voted for Barbara, was asked to make a second nomination.
: Antonio, Clizia, Denver, Fernanda, Paola and Paolo were immune since they are voted as the favorite of the week. For the nominations, the immune housemates would make the nominations in the confessional, and the other housemates would make nominations in public.
: Adriana, Andrea, Antonella, Antonio, Clizia, Denver, Fernanda and Patrick were immune since they are voted as the favorite of the week. For the nominations, the immune housemates would make the nominations in the confessional, and the other housemates would make nominations in public.
: Asia, Simona and Teresanna entered the house as potential housemates.
: Adriana, Aristide, Denver, Fernanda, Licia and Patrick were immune since they are voted as the favorite of the week. For the nominations, the immune housemates would make the nominations in the confessional, and the other housemates would make nominations in public. The public did not vote to save but the housemate received the least vote would be the first nominated on Day 48.
: The public vote involve housemates Andrea, Antonella, Clizia, and Paola was cancelled due to a disciplinary measure against Clizia who used unacceptable sentences.
: The public vote was cancelled on Day 47. And on Day 48, during the live show, Clizia was ejected due to use offensive sentences.
: Adriana, Antonio, Aristide, Fernanda, Licia and Patrick were immune since they are voted as the favorite of the week. For the nominations, the immune housemates would make the nominations in the confessional, and the other housemates would make nominations in public. The most voted housemate will face the public with all the potential housemates. The public did not vote to save but the housemate received the least vote would be the first nominated on Day 55.
: After the nominations, Andrea revealed that he wanted to withdraw from the show for personal reasons. His nomination was therefore nullified. Antonella and Paolo, who had voted for Andrea, was asked to make a second nomination.
: This round of nomination was divided into two parts. For the first part, male housemates had to save one female housemate each, the one was not be saved is nominated. In the second part, all housemates had to nominate one male housemate, the person receiving the most votes is nominated. Teresanna and Valeria did not nominate as Fabio is already the most voted and their nominations will not change anything.
: Week 9 is not present, as no live shows were broadcast during the week.
: A surprise nomination was made during the live show. Adriana and Antonella, the two housemates were saved from the eviction must choose a housemate to save, they chose Denver. Subsequently, Denver is asked to choose who he wanted to save from the nomination and starting a rescue chain. After the rescue chain, Sossio and Teresanna are nominated. However, the two nominated housemates were given the opportunity to choose a housemate each to be nominated, Teresanna chose Valeria and Sossio chose Licia. The winner of the public vote will be crowned the first finalist and the housemate received the least vote will be evicted.
: Adriana decides to withdraw from the show for personal reasons.
: A surprise nomination was made during the live show. All housemates except Sossio were at risk of eviction. They must nominate one housemate and the most voted housemate is Antonio. Antonio was asked to choose a housemate he wants to be nominated, and starting a rescue chain. Finally, Aristide, Sara and Teresanna were nominated with Antonio. The winner of the public vote will be crowned the second finalist and the housemate received the least vote will be evicted.
: For the round of nomination, the finalists Sossio and Aristide, were asked to start two rescue chains, where the housemate wasn't saved will be nominated, they are Paolo and Patrick. Paolo and Patrick were asked to choose a housemate to be nominated together with them, they chose Antonio.
: A surprise nomination was made during the live show. All housemates were at risk of eviction. Male housemates must decide among the female housemates (excluded Paola) who does not deserve to stay. Aristide and Sossio must decide on two housemates to be nominated, Aristide nominated Antonella and Sossio nominated Licia. The winner of the public vote will be crowned the third finalist and the housemate received the least vote will be evicted.
: For the second surprise nomination, Teresanna was nominated. Teresanna was asked who she wanted to challenge in nomination among the male housemates, she chose Paolo. Paolo was also asked who he wanted to challenge in nomination among the male housemates, he chose Denver. The winner of the public vote will be crowned the fourth finalist and the housemate received the least vote will be evicted.

TV Ratings and guests

Live shows

References

External links 
 Official site 

04
Television series impacted by the COVID-19 pandemic